The 1918 Western State Normal Hilltoppers football team represented Western State Normal School (later renamed Western Michigan University) as an independent during the 1918 college football season.  In their 12th season under head coach William H. Spaulding, the Hilltoppers compiled a 3–2 record and outscored their opponents, 223 to 30. The team defeated Hillsdale College, 103 to 0, the largest margin of victory in school history. Quarterback Frank Thomas was the team captain; he later became head coach of the Alabama Crimson Tide football team from 1931 to 1946.

Schedule

References

Western State Normal
Western Michigan Broncos football seasons
Western State Normal Hilltoppers football